Pallikkara is a  village 3 km from Payyoli, in the Kozhikode district of Kerala, India. It is between Vatakara and Koyilandy.

Demographics
 India census, Pallikkara had a population of 20846 with 9985 males and 10861 females.

Transportation
Pallikkara village connects to other parts of India through Koyilandy town.  The nearest airports are at Kannur and Kozhikode.  The nearest railway station is at payyoli .  The national highway no.66 passes through Koyilandy and the northern stretch connects to Mangalore, Goa and Mumbai.  The southern stretch connects to Cochin and Trivandrum.  The eastern National Highway No.54 going through Kuttiady connects to Mananthavady, Mysore and Bangalore.

References

Koyilandy area
Villages in Kozhikode district